Siamak Nemati is an Iranian professional footballer who plays as a right midfielder and right back. His last club was Persepolis in Persian gulf pro league. And in 2020, he played for Iran national team. 

He showed his best performance when playing as a right midfielder.

Club career

Early years
Nemati had started his career with Saipa, and eventually joined their first team. He was part of the Steel Azin squad in 2011–12 Iran Football's 2nd Division and scored 4 times. He joined Moghavemat Tehran U21 in 2012 and spent two seasons with them. He helped Moghavemat to win the 2013–14 Tehran Asia Vision U21 Premier League.

Paykan
Nemati joined Paykan in summer 2014. He made his debut for Paykan on 14 August 2014 against Naft MIS as a starter.

Persepolis

On 7 June 2017, Nemati joined Persian Gulf Pro League champions Persepolis on a two-year contract. He won the 2017–18 league in his first season at Persepolis. He was sent off in a 2–0 lost against Kashima in 2018 ACL First-leg and missed the second-leg match in Tehran. In his second year, Nemati showed his versatility by playing in different positions and scored 6 goals for the team.

International
On 8 October 2020, He made his debut for Team Melli against Uzbekistan.

Club career statistics

Honours
Persepolis
Persian Gulf Pro League (4): 2017–18, 2018–19, 2019–20, 2020–21
Hazfi Cup (1): 2018–19
Iranian Super Cup (4): 2017, 2018, 2019, 2020 ; Runner-Up (1): 2021
AFC Champions League Runner-Up (2): 2018, 2020

Individual
AFC Champions League Fans' Best XI: 2018

References

External links

Siamak Nemati on Instagram

Siamak Nemati at PersianLeague.com
Siamak Nemati at IranLeague.ir

1994 births
Living people
Sportspeople from Tehran
Iranian footballers
Iran international footballers
Association football midfielders
Association football wingers
Association football defenders
Steel Azin F.C. players
Paykan F.C. players
Persepolis F.C. players
Persian Gulf Pro League players
Azadegan League players